Argyria diplomochalis is a moth in the family Crambidae. It was described by Harrison Gray Dyar Jr. in 1913. It is found in Puerto Rico.

References

Argyriini
Moths described in 1913
Moths of the Caribbean